This is a list of tennis players who have represented the Belgium Davis Cup team in an official Davis Cup match. Belgium have taken part in the competition since 1904.

Players

References

Lists of Davis Cup tennis players
Davis Cup